Eleventh Meghalaya Assembly constituted after 2023 Meghalaya Legislative Assembly election. Elections were held in 59 constituencies. Voting on Sohiong was postponed after the death of UDP's candidate H. D. R. Lyngdoh.

History 
After results were declared on 2 March 2023, it resulted into a hung assembly. Ruling NPP got 26 seats however BJP supported MDA.

Notable Position

Party wise distribution

Members

References